

Films

References

LGBT
1997 in LGBT history
1997